Guladty (Dargwa: Гъуладти) is a rural locality (a selo) and the administrative centre of Guladtynsky Selsoviet, Dakhadayevsky District, Republic of Dagestan, Russia. The population was 662 as of 2010. There are 2 streets.

Geography
Guladty is located 29 km southeast of Urkarakh (the district's administrative centre) by road. Dzhirabachi and Trisanchi are the nearest rural localities.

Nationalities 
Dargins live there.

References 

Rural localities in Dakhadayevsky District